{{DISPLAYTITLE:Phi2 Pavonis}}

Phi2 Pavonis (φ2 Pav, φ2 Pavonis) is a solitary star in the southern constellation of Pavo (the Peacock). It is faintly visible to the naked eye with an apparent visual magnitude of +5.10. Based upon an annual parallax shift of 40.55 mas as seen from Earth, it is located 80.4 light years from the Sun. At that distance, the visual magnitude is diminished by an extinction factor of 0.07 due to interstellar dust. It is a member of the thin disk population.

This notation indicates the surface abundance of iron and cyanogen are below normal for this class of star. It is around 5.7 billion years old and is spinning with a period of around 28 days. It has an estimated 1.09 times the mass of the Sun and is 1.86 times the Sun's radius. The star is radiating 3.39 times the solar luminosity from its photosphere at an effective temperature of 6,091 K.

This system was in 1991 a test case for the Zeta Herculis moving group, of low metallicity stars with 5 billion years of age. This group includes besides Zeta Herculis: δ Trianguli, ζ Reticuli, 1 Hydrae, Gl 456, Gl 678, and Gl 9079.

In 1998, using the European Southern Telescope in Chile, a planet was announced to be orbiting the star. This team retracted this claim in 2002, but found a different periodicity of 7 days possibly due to stellar rotation.

See also 
 Zeta Herculis

References

G-type main-sequence stars
Zeta Herculis Moving Group
Pavonis, Phi2
Pavo (constellation)
0794.2 and 9701
196378
101983
7875
Durchmusterung objects